André Deforge (4 March 1914 – 24 January 1996) was a French racing cyclist. He rode in the 1938 Tour de France.

References

External links
 

1914 births
1996 deaths
French male cyclists
Place of birth missing